Rysayevo (Rısay) is a rural locality (a selo) in Ilchinsky Selsoviet, Uchalinsky District, Bashkortostan, Russia. The population was 563 as of 2010. There are 9 streets.

Geography 
Rysayevo is located 26 km north of Uchaly (the district's administrative centre) by road. Kalkanovo is the nearest rural locality.

References 

Rural localities in Uchalinsky District